Shin Won-ho (born August 28, 1975) is a South Korean director and television producer. He is known for producing and directing the acclaimed anthology series Reply.

Filmography

As executive producer

As director

Awards

Awards and nominations

State honors

See Also 

 Lee Woo-jung
 Na Yeong-seok

Notes

References

External links 
 
 

Living people
1975 births
South Korean television producers
South Korean television directors
Seoul National University alumni